Fargoa gibbosa is a species of sea snail, a marine gastropod mollusk in the family Pyramidellidae, the pyrams and their allies.

Description
The shell grows to a length of 0.5 cm and is in the shape of a cone-like Whorl. They are found within depths of 0 to 57 meters, and live in tropical climates. They are also known to live in reefs.

Distribution
This species occurs in the following locations:
 Gulf of Maine
 Gulf of Mexico
 North West Atlantic

Notes
Additional information regarding this species:
 Distribution: Maine to North Carolina, Georgia, Florida; Florida: West Florida

References

External links
 To Biodiversity Heritage Library (1 publication)
 To Encyclopedia of Life
 To ITIS
 To World Register of Marine Species

Pyramidellidae
Gastropods described in 1909